の, in hiragana, and ノ, in katakana, are Japanese kana, both representing one mora. In the gojūon system of ordering of Japanese syllables, it occupies the 25th position, between ね (ne) and は (ha). It occupies the 26th position in the iroha ordering.  Both represent the sound . It is highly similar in form to the Kangxi radical , radical 4.

Stroke order

To write の, begin slightly above the center, stroke downward diagonally, then upward, and then curve around as indicated by the arrows.
To write ノ, simply do a swooping curve from top-right to bottom left.

Other communicative representations

 Full Braille representation

 Computer encodings

History

Like every other hiragana, the hiragana の developed from man'yōgana, kanji used for phonetic purposes, written in the highly cursive, flowing grass script style.  In the picture on the left, the top shows the kanji  written in the kaisho style, and the centre image is the same kanji written in the sōsho style. The bottom part is the kana for "no", a further abbreviation.

Hentaigana and gyaru-moji variant kana forms of no can also be found.

Usage 

の is a dental nasal consonant, articulated on the upper teeth, combined with a close-mid back rounded vowel to form one mora.

In the Japanese language, as well as forming words, の may be a particle showing possession. For example, the phrase "わたしのでんわ” watashi no denwa means "my telephone."

In China

の has also proliferated on signs and labels in the Chinese-speaking world. It is used in place of the Modern Chinese possessive marker 的 de or Classical Chinese possessive marker 之 zhī, and の is pronounced in the same way as the Chinese character it replaces. This is usually done to "stand out" or to give an "exotic/Japanese feel", e.g. in commercial brand names, such as the fruit juice brand 鲜の每日C, where the の can be read as both 之 zhī, the possessive marker, and as 汁 zhī, meaning "juice". In Hong Kong, the Companies Registry has extended official recognition to this practice, and permits の to be used in Chinese names of registered businesses; it is thus the only non-Chinese symbol to be granted this treatment (aside from punctuation marks with no pronunciation value).

References

External links

Information on kana-no from Nuthatch Graphics

Specific kana